Paraburkholderia rhynchosiae is a Gram-negative, rod-shaped bacterium from the genus Paraburkholderia and the family Burkholderiaceae which was isolated from root nodules from the plant Rhynchosia ferulifolia in South Africa.

References

rhynchosiae
Bacteria described in 2013